is a Japanese drummer who is a member of the Japanese band Unicorn.

Works

Singles

Mini albums

Albums

615
 2001–2002 – Guitar: Takeshiitsu Izawa, Bass: Nobuki Tokieda, Vocal: Yuhei

References

External links
 Official mobile site 
 Official smartphone site 
 Black Borders official website 
 Unicorn official website 
 Den-dai 

Japanese drummers
1959 births
Living people
People from Hiroshima Prefecture
Unicorn (Japanese band) members